Pontesbury is a civil parish in Shropshire, England.  It contains 93 listed buildings that are recorded in the National Heritage List for England.  Of these, five are listed at Grade II*, the middle of the three grades, and the others are at Grade II, the lowest grade.  The parish is to the southwest of Shrewsbury.  It contains a number of villages and smaller settlements, including Pontesbury, Pontesford, Plealey, Asterley, Cruckton, Cruckmeole, Arscott, Malehurst, and Habberley, and is otherwise rural.  Most of the listed buildings are houses, cottages, farm houses and farm buildings, a high proportion of which are timber framed, or have timber framed cores, and the earliest of these have cruck construction.  The other listed buildings include two small country houses, churches and chapels, items in the churchyards, and public houses.


Key

Buildings

References

Citations

Sources

Lists of buildings and structures in Shropshire